Xanthias is a genus of crabs in the family Xanthidae, containing two exclusively fossil species and the following extant species:

 Xanthias canaliculatus Rathbun, 1906
 Xanthias cherbonnieri Guinot, 1964
 Xanthias dawsoni Takeda & Webber, 2006
 Xanthias gilbertensis Balss, 1938
 Xanthias glabrous Edmondson, 1951
 Xanthias inornatus (Rathbun, 1898)
 Xanthias lamarckii (H. Milne Edwards, 1834)
 Xanthias latifrons (De Man, 1887)
 Xanthias maculatus Sakai, 1961
 Xanthias nitidulus (Dana, 1852)
 Xanthias oahuensis Edmondson, 1951
 Xanthias punctatus (H. Milne Edwards, 1834)
 Xanthias sinensis (A. Milne Edwards, 1867)
 Xanthias teres Davie, 1997

References

Xanthoidea